The seventh series of the Norwegian talent show Norske Talenter was broadcast beginning on 18 August 2015. Mia Gundersen returned with three new judges: Bjarne Brøndbo, Suleman Malik and Linn Skåber. The host Solveig Kloppen also returned. The young guitarist Odin Landbakk was announced as the winner on 27 November 2015; he was the first guitarist to win the show and Rapper Patrick Jørgensen finished as runner-up.

New additions
For the first time, the series had a golden buzzer which has been introduced into Got Talent shows worldwide: each judge can press once during the auditions, and if they press it the act which receives it goes straight through to the live shows. Linn Skåber golden buzzed songwriter and rapper Patrick Jørgensen, Bjarne Brøndbo golden buzzed the young classical crossover singer Sigrid Haanshus, and Suleman Malik golden buzzed the singer Ronia Keyvan.

Semi-finalists
the 

{|
|  ||| Golden buzzer
|-
| ||| Buzzed
|}

Semifinals
The Semifinals started 16 October 2015 54 acts made it through from judges cuts. 9 acts perform each week with 6 Semifinals taking place 2 acts every week advance to the grand final on 27 November 2015.
Each judge have a buzzer in front of them like previous series if an act reserves four x's the act will be over but everyone can still vote at home. Suleman Malik buzzed in semifinal 4 as he buzzed Fifi von tassel while Mia buzzed spoon player Rune Nordbye in semifinal 6.

Semifinal 1

Semifinal 2

Semifinal 3

Semifinal 4

Semifinal 5

Semifinal 6

Final
Twelve acts reached the final round, which was broadcast on 27 November 2015.

2015 Norwegian television seasons
Norske Talenter